Baphia abyssinica is a species of flowering tree in the family Fabaceae. It is found in western Ethiopia and Sudan. It is threatened by habitat loss, categorized as "vulnerable".

In Ethiopia, the Amharic and Shakacho language name for the tree is shifu. In the Majang language it is known as duwe. Twigs from this tree are used for brushing teeth and fighting tooth infections. The wood is hard and is used for tools, such as for mallets. It is also used for construction house construction.

References

abyssinica
Flora of Sudan
Vulnerable plants
Taxonomy articles created by Polbot
Trees of Ethiopia